National Breakout is the second album by The Romantics, released in 1980 on Nemperor Records.

Track listing
All songs written by Palmar/Marinos/Skill, except where noted.

References 

1980 albums
The Romantics albums